Káloz is a village in Fejér county, Hungary.

In 1559 it was property of Mihály Cseszneky and Balázs Baranyai.

Sources

 Szíj Rezső: Várpalota
 Fejér megyei történeti évkönyv
 Hofkammerarchiv Wien
 Dudar története

External links 

 Street map 

Populated places in Fejér County